The 2019 Tour de Hongrie was the 40th edition of the Tour de Hongrie, between 11 and 16 June 2019. It was the fifth edition of the revival in 2015, and was rated as a 2.1 event as part of the 2019 UCI Europe Tour. The race was won by Krists Neilands, who became the first Latvian rider to win the Tour de Hongrie. Two Hungarian rider got up on the podium, Márton Dina finished 2nd, Attila Valter in 3rd place.

Route

Teams
Nineteen teams were invited to start the race. These included four UCI Professional Continentals, thirteen UCI Continental teams and two national teams.

Stages

Prologue
11 June 2019 — Siófok,

Stage 1
12 June 2019 — Velence to Esztergom,

Stage 2
13 June 2019 — Balassagyarmat to Miskolc,

Stage 3/a
14 June 2019 — Kazincbarcika to Tiszafüred,

Stage 3/b
14 June 2019 — Tiszafüred to Hajdúszoboszló,

Stage 4
15 June 2019 — Karcag to Gyöngyös (Kékestető),

Stage 5
16 June 2019 — Kecskemét to Székesfehérvár,

Classification leadership table
In the 2019 Tour de Hongrie, four jerseys were awarded. The general classification was calculated by adding each cyclist's finishing times on each stage. The leader of the general classification received a yellow jersey sponsored by brand of Hungarian Tourism Agency (WOW Hungary). This classification was considered the most important of the 2019 Tour de Hongrie, and the winner of the classification was considered the winner of the race.

The second classification was the points classification. Riders were awarded points for finishing in the top fifteen in a stage. Points were also won in intermediate sprints. The leader of the points classification was awarded a green jersey sponsored by Europcar.

There was also a mountains classification for which points were awarded for reaching the top of a climb before other riders. The climbs were categorized, in order of increasing difficulty, as third, second and first-category. The leadership of the mountains classification was marked by a red jersey with red sponsored by Hungarian Cycling Federation (Bringasport).

The fourth jersey was a classification for Hungarian riders, marked by a white jersey sponsored by Cofidis. Only Hungarian riders were eligible and they were awarded according to their placement in the general classification of the race.

The final classification was the team classification, in which the times of the best three cyclists in a team on each stage were added together; the leading team at the end of the race was the team with the lowest cumulative time.

Standings

General classification

Points classification

Mountains classification

Hungarian rider classification

Team classification

See also

 2019 in men's road cycling
 2019 in sports

References

External links

2019
Tour de Hongrie
Tour de Hongrie
Tour de Hongrie